The  is a war memorial in the Montreal neighbourhood .

Overview 

The work of sculptor David Estrom (1919), the  stands in the middle of  Park. It commemorates the combatants who died during World War I, World War II, and the Korean War. On a grey granite circular base sits a column decorated with a bronze plate which represents a battalion moving, bayonets leading.

References

External links
 
 

1919 sculptures
History of Montreal
Monuments and memorials in Montreal
1919 in Canada
Canadian military memorials and cemeteries
Military history of Canada
World War I memorials in Canada
World War II memorials in Canada
Bronze sculptures in Canada
Côte-des-Neiges–Notre-Dame-de-Grâce
1919 establishments in Quebec